The House Order of Albert the Bear (German: Hausorden Albrechts des Bären or Der Herzoglich Anhaltische Hausorden Albrechts des Bären) was founded in 1836 as a joint House Order by three dukes of Anhalt from separate branches of the family: Henry, Duke of Anhalt-Köthen, Leopold IV, Duke of Anhalt-Dessau, and Alexander Karl, Duke of Anhalt-Bernburg.

The namesake of the order, Albert the Bear, was the first Margrave of Brandenburg from the House of Ascania. The origin of his nickname "the Bear" is unknown.

This order originally had four ranks, i.e. Grand Cross, Commander 1st Class, Commander 2nd Class and Knight (1st Class). In 1854, the rank Knight 2nd Class was added. In 1864, Leopold IV, who by virtue of the extinction of the other branches of the family had become the sole Duke of Anhalt, altered the statute to provide that the order could be granted with swords. 

On April 29, 1901, in honor of the 70th birthday of Duke Frederick I, a crown was added to all classes of the order. The breast stars of the order remained unchanged. 

The order is still in existence as a House Order, with Eduard, Prince of Anhalt serving as the current Grand Master. The house order has currently three ranks, i.e. Grand Cross, Commander (males) or Dame-Commander (females), and Knight (males) or Dame (females), and as well the Medal of Merit associated with this Order. Recent recipients include Infante Carlos, Duke of Calabria and Princess Khétévane Bagration de Moukhrani.

Recipients 

 Prince Adalbert of Prussia (1811–1873)
 Adolphe, Grand Duke of Luxembourg
 Adolphus Frederick VI, Grand Duke of Mecklenburg-Strelitz
 Adolphus Frederick V, Grand Duke of Mecklenburg-Strelitz
 Albert I of Belgium
 Albert, 8th Prince of Thurn and Taxis
 Prince Albert of Prussia (1809–1872)
 Prince Albert of Saxe-Altenburg
 Albert of Saxony
 Albert, Duke of Schleswig-Holstein
 Prince Albert of Prussia (1837–1906)
 Alexander Frederick, Landgrave of Hesse
 Alexander of Battenberg
 Prince Alexander of Prussia
 Alfred, 2nd Prince of Montenuovo
 Prince Aribert of Anhalt
 Werner Anton
 Prince Arthur, Duke of Connaught and Strathearn
 Prince August, Duke of Dalarna
 Prince August of Württemberg
 Otto von Bismarck
 Walther Bronsart von Schellendorff
 Bernhard von Bülow
 Carl, Duke of Württemberg
 Charles XV
 Charles Alexander, Grand Duke of Saxe-Weimar-Eisenach
 Charles Augustus, Hereditary Grand Duke of Saxe-Weimar-Eisenach (1844–1894)
 Charles Gonthier, Prince of Schwarzburg-Sondershausen
 Chlodwig, Prince of Hohenlohe-Schillingsfürst
 Christian IX of Denmark
 Prince Christian of Schleswig-Holstein
 Prince Christian Victor of Schleswig-Holstein
 Gerhard Conrad (pilot)
 Constantine I of Greece
 Eduard, Duke of Anhalt
 Eduard, Prince of Anhalt
 Ernest Augustus, King of Hanover
 Ernest Louis, Grand Duke of Hesse
 Ernst I, Duke of Saxe-Altenburg
 Ernst Gunther, Duke of Schleswig-Holstein
 Ernst II, Duke of Saxe-Altenburg
 Ferdinand I of Austria
 Hermann von François
 Archduke Franz Ferdinand of Austria
 Franz Joseph I of Austria
 Frederick II, Grand Duke of Baden
 Frederick VII of Denmark
 Frederick VIII of Denmark
 Frederick Augustus II, Grand Duke of Oldenburg
 Prince Frederick Charles of Hesse
 Frederick Francis II, Grand Duke of Mecklenburg-Schwerin
 Frederick I, Duke of Anhalt
 Frederick I, Grand Duke of Baden
 Frederick III, German Emperor
 Prince Frederick of Hohenzollern-Sigmaringen
 Frederick, Prince of Hohenzollern
 Prince Frederick of Prussia (1794–1863)
 Frederick William IV of Prussia
 Frederick William, Grand Duke of Mecklenburg-Strelitz
 Friedrich II, Duke of Anhalt
 Friedrich Ferdinand, Duke of Schleswig-Holstein
 Prince Friedrich Karl of Prussia (1828–1885)
 Prince Friedrich Leopold of Prussia
 Prince Frederick of Schaumburg-Lippe
 Friedrich, Duke of Schleswig-Holstein-Sonderburg-Glücksburg
 Georg II, Duke of Saxe-Meiningen
 George I of Greece
 George V of Hanover
 George Albert, Prince of Schwarzburg-Rudolstadt
 Prince George of Prussia
 George Victor, Prince of Waldeck and Pyrmont
 Erich von Gündell
 Leopold Freiherr von Hauer
 Prince Henry of Prussia (1862–1929)
 Paul von Hindenburg
 Eberhard von Hofacker
 Prince Joachim of Prussia
 Prince Johann of Schleswig-Holstein-Sonderburg-Glücksburg
 John of Saxony
 Joseph, Duke of Saxe-Altenburg
 Ferdinand Jühlke
 Prince Julius of Schleswig-Holstein-Sonderburg-Glücksburg
 Prince Karl Anton of Hohenzollern
 Karl Anton, Prince of Hohenzollern
 Karl, Duke of Schleswig-Holstein-Sonderburg-Glücksburg
 Julius Kühn
 Auguste, Baron Lambermont
 Léo d'Ursel
 Leopold II of Belgium
 Leopold IV, Duke of Anhalt
 Leopold, Hereditary Prince of Anhalt
 Prince Leopold of Bavaria
 Alexander von Linsingen
 Ewald von Lochow
 Louis IV, Grand Duke of Hesse
 Ludwig I of Bavaria
 Maria Emanuel, Margrave of Meissen
 Prince Maximilian of Baden
 Klemens von Metternich
 Milan I of Serbia
 Helmuth von Moltke the Elder
 Prince Moritz of Saxe-Altenburg
 Nicholas I of Russia
 Jean-Baptiste Nothomb
 Oscar II
 Peter II, Grand Duke of Oldenburg
 Prince Philippe, Count of Flanders
 Prince Frederick William of Hesse-Kassel
 Prince Friedrich Wilhelm of Prussia
 Rupprecht, Crown Prince of Bavaria
 Prince William of Schaumburg-Lippe
 Reinhard Scheer
 Princess Friederike of Schleswig-Holstein-Sonderburg-Glücksburg
 Archduke Stephen of Austria (Palatine of Hungary)
 Otto Graf zu Stolberg-Wernigerode
 Hermann von Strantz
 Otto von Stülpnagel
 Tewodros II Emperor of Ethiopia
 Prince Valdemar of Denmark
 Wilhelm II, German Emperor
 William I, German Emperor
 William II of Württemberg
 William Ernest, Grand Duke of Saxe-Weimar-Eisenach
 William IV, Grand Duke of Luxembourg
 Prince William of Baden (1829–1897)
 William, Prince of Hohenzollern

References

External links

Orders, decorations, and medals of Anhalt
1836 establishments in Germany
Awards established in 1836
Orders of chivalry awarded to heads of state, consorts and sovereign family members